This article lists important figures and events in Malayan public affairs during the year 1955, as well as births and deaths of significant Malayans.

Incumbent political figures

Central level 
 Governor of Malaya :
 Donald Charles MacGillivray
 Chief Minister Federation of Malaya :
 Tunku Abdul Rahman Putra Al-Haj

State level 
  Perlis :
 Raja of Perlis : Syed Harun Putra Jamalullail 
 Menteri Besar of Perlis : Raja Ahmad Raja Endut
  Johore :
 Sultan of Johor : Sultan Ibrahim Al-Masyhur
 Menteri Besar of Johor :
 Syed Abdul Kadir Mohamed (until 5 June)
 Vacant (from 5 June to 1 October)
 Wan Idris Ibrahim (from 1 October)
  Kedah :
 Sultan of Kedah : Sultan Badlishah
 Menteri Besar of Kedah : Tunku Ismail Tunku Yahya
  Kelantan :
 Sultan of Kelantan : Sultan Ibrahim
 Menteri Besar of Kelantan : Tengku Muhammad Hamzah Raja Muda Long Zainal Abidin
  Trengganu :
 Sultan of Trengganu : Sultan Ismail Nasiruddin Shah
 Menteri Besar of Terengganu : Raja Kamaruddin Idris
  Selangor :
 Sultan of Selangor : Sultan Sir Hishamuddin Alam Shah Al-Haj 
 Menteri Besar of Selangor : 
 Raja Uda Raja Muhammad (until August)
 Abdul Aziz Abdul Majid (from August)
  Penang :
 Monarchs : Queen Elizabeth II
 Residents-Commissioner : Robert Porter Bingham
  Malacca :
 Monarchs : Queen Elizabeth II
 Residents-Commissioner : Maurice John Hawyard (Acting)
  Negri Sembilan :
 Yang di-Pertuan Besar of Negeri Sembilan : Tuanku Abdul Rahman ibni Almarhum Tuanku Muhammad 
 Menteri Besar Negeri Sembilan : Shamsuddin Naim
   Pahang :
 Sultan of Pahang : Sultan Abu Bakar
 Menteri Besar of Pahang :
 Tengku Mohamad Sultan Ahmad (until 1 February)
 Abdul Razak Hussein (from 1 February to 15 June)
 Tengku Mohamad Sultan Ahmad (from 15 June)
  Perak :
 British Adviser of Perak : Ian Blelloch
 Sultan of Perak : Sultan Yusuf Izzuddin Shah
 Menteri Besar of Perak : Abdul Wahab Toh Muda Abdul Aziz

Events
 8 January – Sabak Bernam declared as a white area (free from the communist insurgency) during the Malayan Emergency.
 12 January – Setapak High School was founded.
 4 April – Sultan Alam Shah Islamic College was founded.
 May – Malacca state declared as a white area (free from the communist insurgency) during the Malayan Emergency.
 4–5 June – 1955 Thomas Cup. Malaya winner this edition defeated Denmark.
 27 July – First General Elections in Malaya. Alliance Party (Parti Perikatan) won 51 parliament seats of 52.
 9 August – Tunku Abdul Rahman formed the first Rahman cabinet after being invited to begin a new government following the 27 July general election
 11 August – A Rhodesian soldier named Shaweleka Fungabelo killed six people and wounded at least twelve people on a mail train travelling from Kuala Lumpur to Singapore before committing suicide.
 11 November – The Malayan People's Party was formed.
 27 November – A rally is held in Kuala Lumpur to urge CPM members to surrender and end the Malayan Emergency.
 5 December – Federal Reserve Unit (FRU) is established.
 Unknown date – Central Provident Fund is established.
 Unknown date – The International School of Penang (Uplands) was founded.
 Unknown date – Kolej Islam Malaya was established before change name to Universiti Islam Malaysia.
 Unknown date – Ministry of Education (Malaysia) is formed.
 Unknown date – YTL Corporation Berhad was founded by Yeoh Tiong Lay.

Births 
 14 January – Raja Kamarul Bahrin Shah Raja Ahmad – Architect and construction expert
 25 January – SM Nasimuddin SM Amin – Entrepreneur and founder of Naza group (died 2008)
 30 May – Rosnah Mat Aris – Actor
 21 July – Danial Zainal Abidin – Motivator and muslim clerics
 14 August – Jamilah Anu – Politician and Adenan Satem wife.
 29 August – Ali Hamsa – Politician, Chief Secretary to the Government of Malaysia (died 2022)
 24 September – Rahim Maarof – Singer
 6 October – Abdul Gani Patail – Former Attorney General of Malaysia
 15 November – Idris bin Jusoh – Politician
 Unknown date – Hail Amir – Singer
 Unknown date – Kartina Aziz – Actor
 Unknown date – Rehman Rashid – Writer and journalist (dies 2017)

Deaths

See also
 1955 
 1954 in Malaya | 1956 in Malaya
 History of Malaysia

 
Years of the 20th century in Malaysia
Malaya
Malaya
Malaya